Capricho árabe (Arabic Caprice) is an 1892 work for classical guitar by Spanish composer Francisco Tárrega. He dedicated it to his friend, conductor Tomás Bretón.

See also
List of compositions by Francisco Tárrega

References

Compositions for guitar
Compositions by Francisco Tárrega